164th meridian may refer to:

164th meridian east, a line of longitude east of the Greenwich Meridian
164th meridian west, a line of longitude west of the Greenwich Meridian